The Catalonia tournament is the regionalised preliminary round of the Copa RFEF (a Spanish football tournament) held in Catalonia. Organized by the Catalan Football Federation, Catalan teams in Segunda División B and Tercera División (Group 5) that did not qualify for the Copa del Rey can register in this tournament, including reserve teams.

History

Source:

Champions
Editions with only one team registered are not included in this ranking.

References

External links
Asturian Football Federation

Sport in Catalonia
Catalonia